Lalramhmunmawia (born 16 March 1997) is an Indian professional footballer who plays as a defender for Mohammedan in the I-League.

Career 
He made his professional debut for the Aizawl against East Bengal F.C. at Salt Lake Stadium on 28 November 2017, He started and played full match match as Aizawl drew 2–2.

Career statistics

Club

References

1997 births
Living people
People from Kolasib
Indian footballers
Aizawl FC players  
Footballers from Mizoram
I-League players
Association football fullbacks